Super-Patriot is a name used by three fictional characters in the universe of Marvel Comics.  The first was an enemy of Nick Fury and S.H.I.E.L.D. The second was John Walker, who used the name Super-Patriot as a rival to Captain America. When Steve Rogers gave up the role of Captain America, Walker was tapped by the Commission on Superhuman Activities to replace Rogers; Walker later adopted the moniker U.S. Agent after Rogers' return. The third person to use the alias was Mike Farrell, a former neighbor of Steve Rogers, who became Super-Patriot and allied himself with Dead Ringer, a mutant villain with the power to mimic.

Fictional character biography

First Super Patriot: Patric List
The Super-Patriot alias Patric List was first seen staging a political rally in New York City, protesting the immigration policies of the United States. His speech labeled American officials who allow foreigners on American soil as "traitors", and encouraged American citizens to overthrow the government. Agents of the anti-terrorist organization S.H.I.E.L.D. came on the scene to arrest Super-Patriot for his refusal of a federal subpoena, and the conflict quickly devolved into a gun battle between the two, from which Super-Patriot ultimately escaped unscathed.

Nick Fury, then a fugitive on the run from S.H.I.E.L.D., receives intelligence from a friend that Super-Patriot is planning a terrorist attack on the United Nations. An undercover agent of the Super-Patriot's informs him that Fury is no threat; this agent later reveals himself to Fury as Jasper Sitwell, a S.H.I.E.L.D. mole. Fury trades places with him and arrives at the United Nations Headquarters just as Super-Patriot is about to destroy it with his "Ultimate Weapon". S.H.I.E.L.D. shows up, and a three-way battle erupts, during which the Super-Patriot attempts to flee, clutching an American flag to his body (believing that S.H.I.E.L.D. agents will not fire at the flag). However, he accidentally trips over the fabric and falls to his death.

Nick Fury removes the Super-Patriot's mask to reveal Nick Fury's own face underneath. However, in later comics it is revealed that this was merely a hallucinatory vision induced by a "truth serum" S.H.I.E.L.D. had used on Fury with the intention of testing his loyalty. The battle with Super-Patriot was apparently real, however, as Fury's colleague Dum Dum Dugan remembers it as well.

Second Super Patriot: John Walker
John Walker became the Super Patriot before taking on the mantle of Captain America following Steve Rogers resignation. He was apparently killed by Scourge in issue 350 although this turned out to be a conspiracy by the US Government who gave him the new identity Jack Daniels and the uniform that Steve Rogers had worn as the Captain (in fact, one of the reasons that triggered Rogers’ resignation was that the Government was claiming they held the copyright to the Captain America design). Daniels as he was now would fight as USAgent.

Third Super Patriot: Mike Farrell
Super-Patriot III aka Mike Farrell was created in Captain America #237 by Chris Claremont, Roger McKenzie and Sal Buscema.

Ex firefighter Mike Farrell joined the Watchdogs sometime later but ran afoul of the terrorists for his guilt over the death of a sleeping janitor in a building he and other members of the Watchdogs burnt down. Turning to Bernie Rosenthal for help when the Watchdogs sought to kill him to rid themselves of a problem, both Farrell and Rosenthal were kidnapped by the group. Captain America and U.S.Agent infiltrated the Watchdogs headquarters and freed their captives but afterwards Farrell turned himself over to Captain America insisting he be punished for his part in the Watchdogs atrocities and the murder of the janitor.

Later, Farrell began blaming Captain America for all the problems he had suffered in his life and teamed up with a mutant called Dead-Ringer aka Louis Dexter to start a campaign to destroy Captain America's reputation. Dead-Ringer would use his mutant power of mimicry to appear as various dead super-villains while Farrell would dress as Captain America and fight the villains sloppily causing collateral damage and tarnishing the real Captain America's image. Farrell also set himself up alternatively as a superhero called the Super-Patriot to likewise show Captain America up by appearing as the superior superhero in staged public fights.

After a long cat-and-mouse game with the real Captain America, Farrell was accidentally killed by Dead-Ringer when the mutant was appearing as Death-Stalker. Revelations of a brain tumor suggested to his friends and doctors Mike was not in full control of his actions.

References

External links
Super-Patriot at the Appendix to the Official Handbook of the Marvel Universe

Comics characters introduced in 1979
Fictional firefighters
Characters created by Gary Friedrich
Characters created by Herb Trimpe
Comics characters introduced in 1969
Marvel Comics supervillains